Isotope fractionation describes fractionation processes that affect the relative abundance of isotopes, phenomena which are taken advantage of in isotope geochemistry and other fields. Normally, the focus is on stable isotopes of the same element. Isotopic fractionation can be measured by isotope analysis, using isotope-ratio mass spectrometry or cavity ring-down spectroscopy to measure ratios of isotopes, an important tool to understand geochemical and biological systems. For example, biochemical processes cause changes in ratios of stable carbon isotopes incorporated into biomass.

Definition
Stable isotopes partitioning between two substances A and B can be expressed by the use of the isotopic fractionation factor (alpha):

where R is the ratio of the heavy to light isotope (e.g., 2H/1H or 18O/16O). Values for alpha tend to be very close to 1.

Types 
There are four types of isotope fractionation (of which the first two are normally most important): equilibrium fractionation, kinetic fractionation, mass-independent fractionation (or non-mass-dependent fractionation), and transient kinetic isotope fractionation.

Example 
Isotope fractionation occurs during a phase transition, when the ratio of light to heavy isotopes in the involved molecules changes. When water vapor condenses (an equilibrium fractionation), the heavier water isotopes (18O and 2H) become enriched in the liquid phase while the lighter isotopes (16O and 1H) tend toward the vapor phase.

See also
 Isotope separation

References

Literature 
Faure G., Mensing T.M. (2004), Isotopes: Principles and Applications (John Wiley & Sons).
Hoefs J., 2004. Stable Isotope Geochemistry (Springer Verlag).
Sharp Z., 2006. Principles of Stable Isotope Geochemistry (Prentice Hall).

Fractionation